Alexander Genrikhovich Beliavsky (also romanized Belyavsky; born December 17, 1953) is a Soviet, Ukrainian and Slovenian chess player. He was awarded the title of Grandmaster by FIDE in 1975. He is also a chess coach and in 2004 was awarded the title of FIDE Senior Trainer.

Beliavsky was born in Lviv, USSR, now Ukraine. He now lives in Slovenia and has been playing for its national team since 1996.

Career

Beliavsky won the World Junior Chess Championship in 1973 and the USSR Chess Championship four times (in 1974, 1980, 1987 and 1990).

In the 1982–84 World Chess Championship cycle, he qualified for the Candidates Tournament, losing to eventual winner Garry Kasparov in the quarterfinals of the 1983 Candidates matches. Beliavsky played on the top board for the USSR team that won the gold medal in the 1984 Chess Olympiad. Beliavsky was a mainstay at international tournaments throughout the eighties and early nineties, however, he did not perform to the highest levels. In the 1985-87 Candidates he finished 7/16, and neither did he qualify for the 1988-90 Candidates tournament nor the 1994-95 PCA Candidates tournament.

In tournaments, he was first equal at Baden bei Wien 1980, first at Tilburg 1981, second equal at Tilburg 1984, joint winner at Wijk aan Zee 1984 and joint second at the same event a year later. At the second Russia (USSR) vs Rest of the World match in 1984, he was the top scorer for the victorious Soviet team, defeating Yasser Seirawan 2–0 and Bent Larsen 1½–½. Beliavsky won the Vidmar Memorial tournament four times: in 1999, 2001, 2003 (with Emil Sutovsky) and 2005. He finished third in the Linares tournament of 1991, behind Vasyl Ivanchuk and Garry Kasparov. 

In November 2009, he was the oldest person among the world's top 100 active players, but as of October 2011 he is no longer in the top 100. He competed at the 2009 Maccabiah Games. In 2013 he tied for 1st–8th places with Alexander Moiseenko, Evgeny Romanov, Hrant Melkumyan, Constantin Lupulescu, Francisco Vallejo Pons, Sergei Movsesian, Ian Nepomniachtchi, Alexey Dreev and Evgeny Alekseev in the European Individual Chess Championship, thus qualifying for the FIDE World Cup.

Beliavsky shares the record for having defeated the most undisputed world champions. He has defeated nine - every undisputed world champion since Vassily Smyslov except Bobby Fischer - a record he shares with Paul Keres and Victor Korchnoi.

Books

See also
 List of Jewish chess players

References

External links
 
 
 
 
 

1953 births
Living people
Chess grandmasters
Chess Olympiad competitors
Chess coaches
Ukrainian chess players
Slovenian chess players
Jewish chess players
Soviet chess players
Soviet Jews
Ukrainian Jews
Slovenian Jews
Slovenian people of Ukrainian-Jewish descent
Jews from Galicia (Eastern Europe)
Sportspeople from Lviv
Naturalized citizens of Slovenia
World Junior Chess Champions
Ukrainian emigrants to Slovenia
Competitors at the 2009 Maccabiah Games
Maccabiah Games chess players
Maccabiah Games competitors for Slovenia